Mark Warkentin (born November 14, 1979) is an American open water swimmer and swimming coach.

After graduating from San Marcos High School in 1998, Warkentin attended the University of Southern California, from which he graduated in 2003 with a degree in communication. While a Trojan, he was a four-time All-American.  He was also awarded USC's Willis Award as a freshman.

Warkentin qualified for the 2008 Summer Olympics in Beijing following his performance at the 2008 Open Water World Championships. In the lead-up to the Games he was noted by Time as one of its "100 Olympic Athletes To Watch." He is a two-time national champion in the open water 25-kilometer, the longest sanctioned race in the sport. The open water event at the Olympics was a 10-kilometer race, which typically lasts around two hours. Warkentin finished in eighth place with a time of 1:52:13.0, just twenty-one seconds behind winner Maarten van der Weijden.
Warkentin became head coach of the Santa Barbara Swim Club on December 1, 2012, returning to lead his childhood team.

See also
 List of University of Southern California people

Notes

References
 USA Swimming athlete bio: Mark Warkentin

External links
 
 
 
 
 
 

1979 births
Living people
American male freestyle swimmers
American Mennonites
Male long-distance swimmers
Olympic swimmers of the United States
Sportspeople from Santa Barbara, California
Swimmers at the 2008 Summer Olympics
USC Trojans men's swimmers
Universiade medalists in swimming
Universiade gold medalists for the United States
Universiade silver medalists for the United States
Medalists at the 1999 Summer Universiade
20th-century American people
21st-century American people